Anand Nagar is a census town in Dhubri district  in the state of Assam, India.

Demographics
 India census, Anand Nagar had a population of 2050. Males constitute 50.7% of the population and females 49.3%. Anand Nagar has an average literacy rate of 69.17%, lower than the state average of 72.19%; with 74.7% of the males and 63.5% of females literate. 15.5% of the population is under 6 years of age.

References

Cities and towns in Dhubri district
Dhubri